École supérieure d'Art de Grenoble is a school of Fine Arts in Grenoble, France.

Notable graduates

 Samuel Rousseau
 Matthieu Laurette
 Barthélémy Toguo
 Dominique Gonzalez-Foerster
Véronique Joumard
 Philippe Parreno
 Pierre Joseph
 Bertrand Planes

References

External links
Official website

Educational institutions in Grenoble
Secondary schools in France